Asia Muhammad and Peng Shuai were the defending champions, but chose not to participate this year.

Elise Mertens and Demi Schuurs won the title, defeating Monique Adamczak and Storm Sanders in the final, 6–2, 6–3.

Seeds

Draw

References
Main Draw

Guangzhou International Women's Open - Doubles
Guangzhou International Women's Open
2017 in Chinese tennis